The Commonwealth Karate Championships is an event that is organised by the Commonwealth Karate Federation for karateka from the Commonwealth. As well as creating competitive opportunities and crowning Commonwealth champions in the sport, the event aims to demonstrate that competition karate is suitable for inclusion in the Commonwealth Games, having been included in the 2020 Summer Olympics and other multisport events. The karate federations of Commonwealth countries are invited to send their national squads to participate in the elite competition, provided that they are members of the World Karate Federation.

This was expanded in Edinburgh 2008, as an open division was introduced, allowing competitors from outside a national squad to enter the event. Further expansion occurred in Johannesburg 2009 with the introduction of cadet and junior categories in the elite competition. In 2022, the championships will be held in the same city as that years Commonwealth Games for the first time, but as a separate event. As of 2022, Karate has not been included in a Games program.

List of Commonwealth Karate Championships

Championships

Guernsey 1988

The first Commonwealth Karate Championships were held on the Channel Island of Guernsey in 1988. Competition was for men only, and consisted of only three weight categories.

Great Britain entered as a single entity. In addition, at this tournament, Australia, Canada,  India, Malaysia, New Zealand, Pakistan, Singapore and Sri Lanka were also represented.

Manchester 2003

The second Commonwealth Karate Championships were held in Manchester, England on 30–31 August 2003.

Wellington 2005
The third Commonwealth Karate Championships were held in Wellington, New Zealand on 12–14 August 2005, hosted by Karate New Zealand.

Elite Event Medal Table 2005

Edinburgh 2008
The fourth Commonwealth Karate Championships were held in Edinburgh, Scotland on 31 May to 1 June 2008, hosted by the Scottish Karate Governing Body. An open division was introduced, which allowed competitors from outside a national squad to enter the event and also provided the first children's categories at the event.

Elite Event Medal Table 2008

Johannesburg 2009
The fifth Commonwealth Karate Championships were held in Johannesburg, South Africa on 16–17 October 2009, hosted by Karate South Africa. Following the introduction of an open event in Edinburgh 2009, cadet and junior categories were introduced to the elite event in line with World Karate Federation rules of competition.

Sydney 2011
The sixth Commonwealth Karate Championships were held in Sydney, Australia on 30–31 July 2011, hosted by Australian Karate Federation.

Montreal 2013
The seventh Commonwealth Karate Championships were held in Montreal, Quebec, Canada on 11–13 October 2013, hosted by Karate Canada.

New Delhi 2015
The eighth Commonwealth Karate Championships will be held at  Talkatora Indoor Stadium, New Delhi, India  18–20 September 2015.  It will be hosted by Karate Association of India.

Elite Event Medal Table 2015

Durban South Africa 2018
The 9th Commonwealth Karate Championships will be held at Olive Convention Centre in Durban, South Africa  29 November to 2 December 2018 –  It will be hosted by Karate South Africa.

National Karate Federations
 India
 Australia
 Canada
 England
 New Zealand
 Northern Ireland
 Scotland
 South Africa
 Wales

References

External links
 Commonwealth Karate Federation
 World Karate Federation
 Commonwealth Games Federation

Commonwealth sports competitions
Karate competitions
Recurring sporting events established in 2003